Sara Ricciardi (born 28 September 1996) is an Italian gymnast. She competed at the 2018 World Championships.

Personal life 
Sara Ricciardi was born on 28 September 1996 in Patti, Sicily, Italy. At age 12, she left Sicily to move to Milan to train. She has a condition called thalassemia which causes her to produce an abnormal amount of haemoglobin, and she considered retiring in 2015 due to it but was persuaded to stay by her coach Michela Francia.

Career 
Ricciardi made her senior international debut at the 2012 City of Jesolo Trophy where the Italian team of Giorgia Campana, Francesca Deagostini, Carlotta Ferlito, Vanessa Ferrari, Giulia Leni won the silver medal behind the United States.

Ricciardi only competed domestically in 2016 and 2017. Her next international competition was the 2018 City of Jesolo Trophy where she finished 25th in the all-around. At the Italian Championships, she won the bronze medal in the all-around behind Giorgia Villa and Elisa Iorio. She withdrew from the 2018 European Championships after fracturing her big toe. She was selected to compete at the 2018 World Championships alongside Irene Lanza, Lara Mori, Martina Rizzelli, and Martina Basile. The team finished 12th in the qualification round, and Ricciardi was the second reserve for the all-around final.

References 

1996 births
Living people
Italian female artistic gymnasts
Sportspeople from the Province of Messina
21st-century Italian women